Marina Vadimovna Zhadan (born 21 August 1992), better known under the pseudonym Mari Kraimbrery, is a Russian singer of Ukrainian origin, songwriter, record producer.

She gained her first fame after the release of the single "Smogu li ya bez tebya" on July 16, 2012, which was a great success on social networks.

Marina is a laureate and nominee of various music awards, including the Muz-TV, RU.TV and "ZD Awards" awards. Two-time winner of the Russian music award "Golden Gramophone Award" of the radio station "Russkoye Radio" (for the songs "" and "".

Discography 
 The main article in the Russian-language section of Wikipedia, see Mari Kraimbrery discography

Albums 
  (2017)
  (2018)
  (2021)
  (2022)

Awards and nominations 
 The main article in the Russian-language section of Wikipedia, see List of awards and nominations received by Mari Kraimbrery

References

External links 

Living people
1992 births
Russian pop singers
Ukrainian emigrants to Russia